Yang Yoo-jin (born March 19, 1995), also known by her former stage name Yeon Yisoo is a South Korean singer, actress and model.

Early life
Yang was born on March 19, 1995, in South Korea. She graduated from Jeonju Fine Arts High School.

Career
Yang is a former TS, MBK, WMY and Source Music trainee. She was in GFriend pre-debut lineup but did not make her debut. Yang made her debut with Heart on December 26, 2016, with their debut single, "Jooruruk" under KC Entertainment. However, the group disbanded in 2017.

Yang made her debut as a model and is managed under MY COMPANY. She made her acting debut in the web series Sleepless in Love in 2018. She was cast in the series Best Mistake 2 as Yoon Ah-ra in 2020. Yang played a supporting role in A Love So Beautiful as Seo Ji-soo aired on December 28, 2020.

Filmography

Television series

Music video appearances

References

External links
 

1995 births
Living people
21st-century South Korean actresses
South Korean female idols
South Korean women pop singers
South Korean female models
South Korean television actresses
21st-century South Korean women singers
21st-century South Korean singers
South Korean television personalities